"Earfquake" (stylized in all caps) is a song by American producer and rapper Tyler, the Creator. It is the second song from his fifth studio album, Igor (2019). It features an uncredited guest appearance from American rapper Playboi Carti and background vocals by Charlie Wilson and Jessy Wilson. It was released as the album's lead single to rhythmic contemporary radio on June 4, 2019. Its official remix by Channel Tres was released on October 4, 2019. "Earfquake" is Tyler, the Creator's highest charting song in the US, peaking at number 13 on the Billboard Hot 100. It was also ranked 14th on Billboards 100 Best Songs of 2019 list.

Background
Tyler initially wrote the song for Canadian singer Justin Bieber, who turned down the song. Tyler then asked Barbadian singer Rihanna to provide vocals to the hook believing the song would be big, but she also rejected the song. Tyler instead kept in his own raw vocals. "Earfquake" was initially leaked online on May 7, 2019.

Music video
A music video for "Earfquake" was released alongside the album's release on May 17, 2019. The video opens with a cameo from Tracee Ellis Ross as a talk show host. Tyler then takes the stage, wearing a blue suit and a Warholian wig, dancing, singing, and playing the piano until his cigarette sets everything on fire, where he suffers various burns and then passes out. Tyler then returns as a firefighter to put out the fire.

Personnel
Credits adapted from Tidal and liner notes.

 Tyler Okonma – lead vocals, production, recording
 Playboi Carti – featured vocals
 Charlie Wilson – background vocals
 Jessy Wilson – background vocals
 Vic Wainstein – recording
 Ashley Jacobson – recording assistance
 Thomas Cullison – recording assistance
 Treveon Vaughn – Recording assistance

Charts

Weekly charts

Year-end charts

Certifications

References

2019 songs
Tyler, the Creator songs
Songs written by Tyler, the Creator
Songs written by Playboi Carti
2019 singles
Playboi Carti songs